"There'll Be Some Changes Made" ("Changes") is a popular song by Benton Overstreet (composer) and Billy Higgins (lyricist). Published in 1921, the song has flourished in several genres, particularly jazz. The song has endured for as many years as a jazz standard. According to the online The Jazz Discography (an index of jazz-only recordings), "Changes" had been recorded 404 times as of May 2018. The song and its record debut were revolutionary, in that the songwriters (Overstreet and Higgins, the original copyright publisher, Harry Herbert Pace, the vocalist to first record it (Ethel Waters), the owners of Black Swan (the record label), the opera singer (Elizabeth Greenfield) for whom the label was named, and the musicians on the recording led by Fletcher Henderson, were all African American. The production is identified by historians as a notable part of the Harlem Renaissance.

History and popularity milestones

1920s
The debut recording with Ethel Waters was recorded on Black Swan Records (1921) and rapidly became a hit.  Her rendition features the rarely-heard 6-bar instrumental intro, followed by her singing the 1st verse (16 bars, plus 1), then her singing the 1st chorus (16 bars, plus 2), then instruments playing 8 bars of the chorus, finishing with her singing the 1st chorus (16 bars, plus 2).

Variety magazine, in a fifty-year commemorative issue, included Ethel Waters' recording in its "Hit Parade of a Half-Century (1905–1955)" list for 1923.  A 1924 recording by Marion Harris (Brunswick 2651) helped establish it as a standard. Other artists with notable recordings during the 1920s include Josie Miles (Ajax 17087; 1924), Sophie Tucker (Okeh 40921; 1927), and the Chicago Rhythm Kings (Red McKenzie, vocalist; Brunswick 4001; 1928).  In jazz discography, which does not include the recordings of Marion Harris or Sophie Tucker, there were 11 recordings of the song during the 1920s.

1930s
Standout recordings from the 1930s include Fats Waller (Bluebird B10322; 1935), Pee Wee Russell's Rhythmakers (HRS (de) 1000; 1938), and Benny Goodman and His Orchestra (Louise Tobin, vocalist, Fletcher Henderson arrangement; Columbia 35210; 1939).  In jazz discography, there were 17 recordings of the song during the 1930s, including double takes by (i) Benny Carter and His Swing Quintet (Masters of Jazz (F)MJCD95 CD & Vocalion S46), (ii) Pee Wee Russell's Rhythmakers (both takes on HRS 1001; 1938), (iii) Benny Goodman And His Orchestra (Columbia 35210 & Phontastic (Swd)NOST7606; 1939), and (iv) Eddie Condon And His Chicagoans (Decca 18041 & Meritt 11; 1939).

1940s
1941 was not a good year for newly published popular music.  According to a January 31, 1942, Billboard article, ASCAP members claimed only 2 of the top 13 sellers in sheet music.  Five of the remaining 11 were revivals, one of which was "There'll Be Some Changes Made."  The 1941 film, Play Girl, gave new life to the song.  In 1941, Benny Goodman's 1939 version became a Billboard No. 1 Hit for 4 weeks (during April and May) and peaked at No. 2 on Your Hit Parade.  In 1961, BMI published a list, "All-Time Hit Songs, Broadcast Music, Inc., 1940–1960," in Billboard.  "There'll Be Some Changes Made" was among the 17 songs listed for 1947.  In jazz discography, there were 60 recordings of the song during the 1940s.

Notable recordings from the 1940s include Vaughn Monroe and His Orchestra (Marilyn Duke, vocalist; Bluebird B-11025-A; 1941), and Peggy Lee (Capitol 15001; 1947).

1950s
In early 1959, Billie Holiday did three sessions with Ray Ellis and orchestra for MGM Records in New York: March 3, 4, and 11.  She recorded "Changes" in the final session.  That session turned out to be the last studio session of her life.  She died  later — on July 17.  The album — released under various titles, notably, Last Recording (MGM SE-3764; 1959) — was posthumously released.

In jazz discography, there were 42 recordings of "Changes" during the 1950s.

1960s – current
Notable artists who recorded "Changes" include Jaki Byard (Muse 5007; 1972), Tony Bennett (Improv 7112; 1973–1977) and Fox Face (Dirtnap Records ZZZ-163; 2021)

2000
In 2004, Tony Bennett sang that song again at the Montreux Jazz Festival with the Phil Collins Big Band accompanied by pianist Ralph Sharon and double bassist Douglas Richeson, and that event can be heard on Collins's 4 CD box set Plays Well with Others published in 2018.

Western swing and country western
Outside of jazz, in western swing, Bob Wills recorded it in 1937 (Vocalion DAL 244-1).  In country music, Chet Atkins and Mark Knopfler recorded — on their 1990 Grammy award winning album Neck and Neck — a parody version that references the Dire Straits song "Money for Nothing"

Selected videography, filmography, and stage 
Feature films
 Use of the song in the 1941 film, Play Girl, helped repopularize the song 20 years after its debut.
 Ida Lupino sang the song in the 1948 film, Road House
 Joan Blondell sang the song in the 1951 film, The Blue Veil
 In the 1972 film Slaughterhouse-Five, a quartet is singing the song when the airplane Billy Pilgrim is traveling in spins out of control and crashes.
 Ann Reinking sang and danced to the song accompanied by Leland Palmer and Erzsébet Földi during the "Hallucination Sequence" in the 1979 film, All That Jazz, directed by Bob Fosse. Reinking, Fosse's previous partner, directs the song to Roy Scheider playing Joe Gideon, a semi-autobiographical version of Fosse himself.
 The soundtrack of Woody Allen's 1999 film, Sweet and Lowdown, included "There'll Be Some Changes Made," recorded by members of the film's music department: Howard Alden, solo guitar, Bucky Pizzarelli, rhythm guitar, Ken Peplowski, clarinet, Kelly Friesen, bass, and Ted Sommer, drums. In the scene, Emmet Ray, played by Sean Penn in the lead role as a guitarist, is playing the song with his quintet at a club as he is approached by a woman with black hair.

Shorts
 The 1928 Vitaphone short film, Character Studies (Vitaphone 2734), directed by Murry Roth, featured three songs, including "Changes," all sung by Florence Brady (née Florence E. McAleer; born approx. 1902), a comedian, singer, vaudeville actress, and longtime stage partner with her songwriter husband, Gilbert William Wells (1893–1935).

Selected discography 

Ethel Waters, accompanied by Her Jazz Masters
Trumpet (unknown), trombone (unknown), Garvin Bushell (clarinet), possibly Charlie Jackson (violin), Fletcher Henderson (piano)
Recorded around August 1921, New York
(audio on YouTube)
Black Swan 2021
Matrix P147-1

Josie Miles
With the Choo Choo Jazzers
Josie Miles (vocals), Bob Fuller (clarinet), Louis Hooper (piano)
Recorded circa December 1924, New York City
(audio on YouTube)
Ajax (Canadian Race label) 17087
Matrix 31749

Sophie Tucker
Recorded September 3, 1927
(audio on YouTube)
Matrix W81314-B
Okeh 40921

Chicago Rhythm Kings
Red McKenzie (singer), Muggsy Spanier (clarinet), Frank Teschmacher (clarinet), Mezz Mezzrow (tenor sax), Joe Sullivan (piano), Eddie Condon (banjo), James W. Lanigan (1902–1983) (tuba), Gene Krupa (drums)
Recorded April 6, 1928, Chicago
Brunswick 4001
Re-release: Classic Jazz Masters 31

Boswell Sisters
Mannie Klein (trumpet), Tommy Dorsey (trombone), Jimmy Dorsey (clarinet ,alto sax), Babe Russin (tenor sax), Martha Boswell (piano, cello), Eddie Lang (guitar), Artie Bernstein (bass), Stan King (de) (drums)
Recorded March 21, 1932, New York City
(audio on YouTube)
Matrix: 11543-A
Brunswick 6291

Roy Newman (de) and His Boys
Recorded October 1, 1935, Dallas
Roy Newman (piano), Jim Boyd (born 1914) (brother of musician Bill Boyd brother) (guitar), Earl Brown (guitar), Ish Erwin (bass), Holly Horton (1892–1944) (clarinet), Walter Kirks (tenor banjo), Randall "Buddy" Neal (guitar), Thurman Neal (fiddle)
Matrix: DAL-196-1
Vocalion 03325

Bob Wills (1937)
Recorded June 1937, Dallas
03902 Vocalion
(audio on YouTube)
Matrix DAL 244-1 (1st take)

Benny Goodman
Louise Tobin, vocalist
Arrangement by Fletcher Henderson
Recorded August 10, 1939, Los Angeles
(audio on YouTube)
Columbia 35210
Matrix LA-1947-A
(first of 2 takes)

Eddie Condon
and His Chicagoans
(instrumental, no vocals)
Max Kaminsky (trumpet), Brad Gowans (trombone), Pee Wee Russell (clarinet), Bud Freeman (tenor sax), Joe Sullivan (piano), Eddie Condon (guitar), Clyde Newcombe (bass), Dave Tough (drums)
Recorded August 11, 1939, New York City
Matrix – 66072-A: "There'll Be Some Changes Made"
Matrix – 66072-B: "There'll Be Some Changes Made"
66072-A: Decca 18041
66072-B: Meritt 11

Art Tatum
Recorded live July 26 or 27, 1941, at Gee-Haw Stables, New York City
Art Tatum (piano), Chocolate Williams (bass)
Ollie Potter (vocalist) (born 1900 – DOD not known)
(audio on YouTube)
Onyx ORI205
Track 8 of 8

(see note: †)

Vaughn Monroe and His Orchestra
Recorded January 13, 1941
(audio on YouTube)
Marylin Duke (vocalist)
Bobby Nichols (né Robert J. Nichols; 1924–1975) (trumpet solo)
Bluebird B-11025-A
Side A (matrix 060317=1)

Peggy Lee
With Frank de Vol's Orchestra
Recorded August 14, 1947, Los Angeles
(audio on YouTube)
Matrix: 
Capitol 15001-B

Hy-Lo Trio (vocals and instrumentalist)
78 rpm album:
Old Tyme Favourites
Recorded around 1948, Boston
Vinnie "Jimmy Cal" Calderone (accordion)
Angelo Boncore
(né Angelo Joseph Boncore; 1919–2012) (bass)
Side B, Track 3
Label:
Crystal-Tone (Boston)
Re-issue:
Family Library of Recorded Music (Canada)
(audio on YouTube)
1007-B

Dinah Washington
On the album:
Dinah!
Recorded November 11, 1955, Los Angeles
(audio on YouTube)
Hal Mooney, arranger
Accompanied by Maynard Ferguson, Conrad Gozzo, Ray Linn, Mannie Klein (trumpets); Tommy Pederson, Frank Rosolino, Si Zentner (trombones); Herb Geller, Skeets Herfurt (alto saxes); Georgie Auld, Babe Russin (tenor saxes); Chuck Gentry (né Charles Thomas Gentry; 1911–1987) (bari sax); Wynton Kelly (piano); Al Hendrickson (de) (guitar); Keter Betts (bass); Jimmy Cobb (drums); Harold "Hal" Mooney (director)
Matrix 12401-4
EmArcy MG36065

Soundtrack
From the 1957 film
Designing Woman
Album title: Miss Dolores Gray:
Legendary Star of Stage and Screen
(video on YouTube)'
Blue Pear Records 1014

Billie Holiday
Billie Holiday With Ray Ellis And His Orchestra
Accompanied by Harry "Sweets" Edison (trumpet), Joe Wilder (trumpet), Billy Byers (trombone), Al Cohn (tenor sax), Danny Bank (bari sax), Hank Jones (piano), Barry Galbraith (guitar), Milt Hinton (bass), Osie Johnson (drums), Ray Ellis (arranger, conductor)
Recorded March 11, 1959
(audio on YouTube)
59XY445: "There'll Be Some Changes Made"
MGM SE-3764
Verve (E)2304120
 (MGM)

Dave Brubeck
Brubeck and Rushing
Recorded January 29, 1960, New York City
(audio on YouTube)
Paul Desmond (alto sax), Dave Brubeck (piano), Eugene Wright (bass), Joe Morello (drums), Jimmy Rushing (vocals)
Matrix: CO64697
Columbia CL1553

Julie London
Whatever Julie Wants (LP)
With orchestra
Felix Slatkin (conductor)
Recorded in Hollywood, c., July 1961
Track B5: "There'll Be Some Changes Made"
(audio on YouTube)
Liberty LST 7192 (LP) US (1961)
Liberty LRP 3192 (LP, Mono) Australia (1961)
7" Reel, 4tr, Stereo, Album, Liberty LT 7192 US (1961)
Promo, Whi, Liberty LRP 3192 (LP, Mono) US (1961)
Longon HA-G 2405 (LP, Mono) UK (1961)

Jackie Gleason
Recorded 1961; released 1962
Jackie Gleason's Lover's Portfolio
Capitol SWBO-1619
2 LPs (compilation)
Track B1 (of side A, B, C, D)

Tony Bennett
On the album:
Life Is Beautiful
Arranged by Torrie Zito
Recorded 1975
(audio on YouTube)
Tony Bennett (vocals), Torrie Zito (piano), John Guiffrida (bass), Chuck Hughes (drums), and orchestra
Improv 7112

Soundtrack (New York)
Recorded March 22, 1976, A & R Recording, New York
Original Broadway Cast from:
Bubbling Brown Sugar
H&L HL-69011-698
Act 2, Scene 3
Track B4
Josephine Premice, vocalist

Amherst Records AMH 3310 (CD)

Soundtrack (London)
London Cast from:
Bubbling Brown Sugar
Act 2, Scene 3
Released 1977
Elaine Delmar, vocalist
H&L HL-69011-698

Pye (CD)

Duke Ellington Orchestra
Mercer Ellington, director
Bruce Miller, arranger
A Tribute To Ethel Waters
Recorded 1978, Hollywood
(audio-1 & audio-2 on YouTube)
Diahann Carroll (vocals)
Orinda ORC4000

Chet Atkins and Mark Knopfler
Neck and Neck (album)
Released October 9, 1990
(audio on YouTube)
Columbia

Celebrating Mildred Bailey and Red Norvo
Recorded April 21, 22, 23, 1996, Doppler Studios, Atlanta
(audio on YouTube)
Audiophile ACD-295 (CD)
Daryl Sherman (vocals, piano), Randy Sandke (trumpet), Randy Reinhart (trombone), Bobby Gordon (de) (clarinet, tenor sax), John Cocuzzi (vibes, leader), Mark Shane (piano), James Chirillo (guitar), Greg Cohen (bass), Joe Ascione (drums)

Soundtrack
Woody Allen's 1999 film
Sweet and Lowdown
Byron Stripling (trumpet), Ken Peplowski (clarinet), Dick Hyman (piano), Howard Alden (solo guitar), Bucky Pizzarelli (rhythm guitar), Kelly Friesen (bass), Ted Sommer (drums)
Recorded in Hollywood, 1999
Track 5: "There'll Be Some Changes Made"
Sony Classical SK89019 (CD)

Scott Hamilton
Live in Bern: Scott Hamilton & Jeff Hamilton Trio
Live at Marian's Jazzroom, Bern, Switzerland, May 18, 2014
(audio on YouTube)
Scott Hamilton (tenor sax), Tamir Hendelman (piano), Christoph Luty (bass), Jeff Hamilton (drums)
Track 7: "There'll Be Some Changes Made"
Capri 74139-2 (CD)

 Unreleased recordings
Duke Ellington and his Orchestra
Live: June 1, 1957, Sunset Ballroom
Near Carrolltown, Pennsylvania
Shorty Baker (trumpet), Quentin Jackson (trombone), Russell Procope (clarinet), Duke Ellington (piano), Joe Benjamin (bass), Sam Woodyard (drums)

 Notes on the Tatum recording

 † "There'll Be Some Changes Made," was recorded in 1941 on acetate discs by an amateur, a Columbia Student, Jerry Newman (né Jerome Robert Newman; 1918–1970), and released in the 1973.  Newman's collection was the initial sole material used to launch the jazz label, Onyx Recording, Inc. (aka Onyx Records), a New York entity co-founded in 1972 by Don Schlitten and Joe Fields.

 Newman, while a student at Columbia in 1941, lugged his acetate disc recording machine – a portable Wilcox-Gay Recordio "disc cutter" – to jazz clubs in Harlem, including Minton's Playhouse on 118th Street and Clark Monroe's Uptown House on 134th Street, both of which were incubators of jazz of the day, and in 1941, the beginning of bebop.  Newman's collection served as the core library for Onyx Recording, Inc.  Art Tatum at Minton's in 1941, issued by Onyx after being declined by Columbia, on the LP God Is in the House. At the 16th Annual Grammy Awards held in March 1974, the album won two Grammys, one for Best Improvised Jazz Solo and one for Best Liner Notes, written by Morgenstern.  Newman's recordings have been issued as unauthorized records, variously over the years; that is, none were done so with the permission or participation of the artists or their estates. The commercial value of the recordings were deemed ; and those who acquired and distributed the recordings viewed the mission as one of curating jazz history.

 The Art Tatum session at Gee-Haw Stables, later, became the subject of a poem, "Art Tatum at the Gee-Haw Stables," by Grace Schulman.

Selected rollography (player pianos) 
MelOdee 1257
Melodee Music Co., Inc.

QRS 7389
February 1941
Fats Waller, piano roll artist

QRS Word Roll 8316
J. Lawrence Cook, piano roll artist
(audio on YouTube)

Aeolian 1741
J. Lawrence Cook, piano roll artist

Copyrights 
 Original copyright
 "There'll Be Some Change Made" (sic  "Change" vs. "Changes")
 Billy Wiggins (pseudonym of William Higgins) (words)
 Benton Overstreet (music)
 Fletcher Hamilton Henderson Jr. (arrangement)
 © 16 September 1921 (1 c.) E519207
 New York: Harry Herbert Pace

 Subsequent copyrights
 © 17 September 1923 E569379
 © 1924 New York: Edward B. Marks Music Corp.
 Billy Wiggins (pseudonym of Billy Higgins) (lyrics)
 William Belton Overstreet (music) (1888–1939)
 

 5 additional choruses by Wilson & Ringle
 © 20 November 1924 E601555; © Renewal 10 December 1951 R87327 (Wilson & Ringle arrangement)
 © 20 November 1924 E601555; © Renewal 20 November 1951 R86297 (Wilson & Ringle arrangement)
 

 Arrangements and renewals
 © 31 January 1940 EP83470; © Renewal 31 January 1967 R403184 (scored by Jerry Gray; Artie Shaw, arr.) 
 © 20 February 1940 EP83170; © Renewal 1 March 1967 R405147 (Roy Eldridge, arr.)
 © 22 May 1941 EP94890 (Harry Henneman; born 1913; arr.)
 © 14 September 1945 EP134967; © Renewal 26 September 1972 R536531 (Van Alexander, arr.)
 © 14 April 1948 EP25222 (Claude G. Garreau, vocal arr., TTBB, published in Time to Harmonize, Vol. 2, pps. 14–15); 
 © 16 September 1921 E519207; © Renewal 20 September 1948 R38135 (Henderson, arr.)
 © 16 September 1921 E519207; © Renewal 17 September 1948 R38310 (Henderson, arr.)
 © 16 December 1924 E603539; © Renewal 10 December 1951 R87328 (Wheeler, arr.)
 © 17 September 1923 E569379; © 7 January 1954 EP77406 (arrangement by Bud Arburg, EdD, né Harold Walton Arberg Sr. 1918–2009; for four male voices – TTBB)
 © 13 August 1929 EP8383 (arr. for orchestra by Ted Lewis); © Renewal 24 August 1956 R175950
 © 1958? (arrangement by Clay Warnick; 1915–1995; for SATB & piano), Plate N° 13861;  
 © 28 April 1965 EP201952 (Charles E. Brooks, arr. for barbershop quartet)
 © 2012 (transcribed & adapted by Myles Collins; vocal arrangement for big band); Salamander Bay: England Lush Life Music, Plate N° LLM2172; 

 International versions / editions
 © 1959; (Swedish text by Tommy, pseudonym of Lennart Reuterskiöld (sv), 1898–1986; for voice & piano with chords); Stockholm: Reuter & Reuter; 

 Catalog of Copyright Entries, Part 3 Musical Compositions, New Series, Library of Congress, Copyright Office
 Original and renewal copyrights

 Catalog of Copyright Entries, Third Series, Renewal Registrations-Music, Library of Congress, Copyright Office
 Copyright renewals and arrangements

Sheet music covers 
Edward B. Marks Corporation was the publisher of "There'll Be Some Changes Made."  The sheet music cover design, artwork by Irving Politzer (1898–1972), featured portraits of performers who had recorded the song.  Those appearing on covers include Marion Harris, Ruth Etting, and Benny Goodman.

Subtitle on some sheet music covers 
Some sheet music covers, even 1st editions, included the subtitle, in parentheses, "Philosophic Blues."

Notes

References

1921 songs
Sophie Tucker songs
1920s jazz standards
Harlem Renaissance
Songs written by Benton Overstreet
Songs with lyrics by Billy Higgins